iAuthor is a London-based tech start-up and online book community that launched in July 2013. Described in The Bookseller as a "Pinterest for books," iAuthor connects authors and publishers to readers using crowdsourced themes and book samples.

History
iAuthor was founded by Adam Kolczynski on 18 January, 2012. After operating in beta mode for a few months, it officially launched on July 26, 2013, opening the platform to all authors and publishers.

As of March 2016, iAuthor had users from 144 countries. The ratio of traditionally published to self-published authors is 40:60, with books by authors from Pan Macmillan, HarperCollins, Harlequin, Walker Books, Accent Press, and Andersen Press.

Features

Crowdsourced book themes with invite functionality
Proprietary book sampler ("LitSampler")
Client-facing analytics dashboard measuring book performance
Native advertising across sponsored zones ("7dayAds") and genre-specific promotional packages ("iAuthor Impact")

Partnerships 
iAuthor has a corporate partnership with Book Aid International, donating to literacy-related causes organised by the charity.

References

External links
iAuthor official site
iAuthor on Twitter
iAuthor on Facebook

Book websites
British social networking websites
Companies based in the London Borough of Ealing
Online retailers of the United Kingdom